The New Zealand national cricket team visited Sri Lanka for the first time in 1983-84 and played 3 Tests.  New Zealand won the series 2-0 with 1 match drawn:

Test series

1st Test

2nd Test

3rd Test

One Day Internationals (ODIs)

New Zealand won the series 2-1.

1st ODI

2nd ODI

3rd ODI

External links
Result
New Zealand cricket team in Sri Lanka, 1983/84

1984 in New Zealand cricket
1984 in Sri Lankan cricket
International cricket competitions from 1980–81 to 1985
1983-84
Sri Lankan cricket seasons from 1972–73 to 1999–2000